Marathwada Mitra Mandal's College of Commerce popularly known as MMCC is a college in Deccan Gymkhana Pune. It is one of the leading Commerce colleges in the city.

History
Marathwada Mitra Mandal, Pune is a charitable trust registered under the Bombay Public Trust Act 1950. Shri.

In July, 1985 the trust founded the College of Architecture with the B.Arch course. In the same year, the trust also founded the school of Interior Designing. In 1986, the Commerce college was founded. The Commerce college is steadily growing and producing outstanding academic results. The college is affiliated to the Savitribai Phule Pune University.

Awards
It was presented the "Best College" award by the University under its Quality Improvement Programme in 2009.

Academics
It offers B.Com, M.Com, [MAJMC] Masters in Journalism and Mass Communication PG Post Graduate Diploma in Banking and Finance and Post Graduate Diploma in Foreign Trade along with BBA and BBM-IB programmes. The college also offers BSc Computer Science and BCA courses. The college was one of the first in the city to offer the BBA program.

Campus
Apart from the Commerce college, the campus houses the Institute of Management, Education, Research and Training offering the MBA and MPM programmes. It is also home to the Shankarrao Chavan Law College.

The campus has
 Library
 Hostel
 Computer Lab
 Assembly hall 
 Gymnasium

Recognition
The college once secured 4th place in a Top 5 colleges survey conducted by India Today. It has been accredited by NAAC with an 'A'  grade.

Sister institutes
The trust has institutes for Law, Engineering, Pharmacy and Polytechnics.

This college also offers management courses

Notable members and alumni
The trust was founded by Shankarrao Chavan and a few other members like S.M. Garge, and S.B. Jadhav. Former chief minister of Maharashtra, Vilasrao Deshmukh was the president of the trust. Actress Mugdha Godse graduated from this college.

References

External links
Official website
 http://bcud.unipune.ac.in/utilities/college_search/CAAP010620_ENG/Pune_University_College

Mugdha Godse

Universities and colleges in Pune
Commerce colleges in India